The Deva are a mythical people of Sri Lanka according to the Sanskrit epics.
According to the Mahavamsa and Ramayana they lived among the Naga, Yakkha and Raskha. 
They ousted their arch enemies the Raskha from Sri Lanka, with the help of  Vishnu.
They were then subsequently conquered by King Ravana of the Raskha. After the Yakkhas had left to live in the mountains and remote dense forests, they met Gautama Buddha who converted them to Buddhism.

According to the Mahavamsa, Gautama Buddha met the Deva at Mahiyangana. Buddha gave Sumana Saman (A leader of the Deva) a few hairs from his head, which were placed in a golden urn and enshrined in a sapphire stupa. A buddhist monk called Sarabhu is then said to have deposited Buddha's ashes in this Stupa. This stupa is now called the "Mahiyangana Stupa" and can be found in the Anuradhapura museum.

Sumana Saman was a leader of the Deva who came from the central hills of Sri Lanka. Some Sri Lankan Buddhists worship him as a deity. He is said to be the guardian of Samanalakanda.

Migration

During the ascension of the mythical Raksha demon King Ravana, some Deva people migrated to other places like present-day North Malabar of Kerala where they followed Dravidian folk religion before the advent of Hinduism.  they still survive in Malabar, and are known as "Divyar" or "Thiyyar", a localization of the name "Deyva" equivalent to Deva. The ancestor worship of Thiyyas springs from the fact that they consider themselves as descendants of "Deyva" or God. The ceremonial oracles, who represent the spirit of their ancestors of Lanka, in the temple are known as "Theyyam", originating from the word "Deyvam" meaning God. However, by the time of the legendary arrival of Vijaya to Sri Lanka, a significant number of the Deva clan is held in popular tradition had intermingled with North Indians, Nagas and Yaksas, to create the Sinhalese lineage.

References

H. Parker (1909). Ancient Ceylon. New Delhi: Asian Educational Services. 7.
H.R Perera. (1988). Buddhism in Sri Lanka - A short history. Available: http://www.buddhanet.net/pdf_file/bud-srilanka.pdf. Last accessed 02 10 10.

Ramayana
Buddhism in Sri Lanka
Exotic tribes in Hindu scripture